Jan Lambrecht (born in Wielsbeke, 1926) is a Belgian Catholic priest of the Society of Jesus, Professor Emeritus of New Testament and Biblical Greek at the Faculty of Theology and Religious Studies, KU Leuven, Belgium and former member of the Pontifical Biblical Commission. As a theologian, biblical scholar, and prolific author, he has contributed numerous studies on almost all the books of the New Testament, but focusing especially on the Gospels and the Pauline letters. His publications include books and articles written in English, Dutch, and French.

Education 
Lambrecht joined the Society of Jesus in 1945. He received a licentiate in Philosophy in 1952 from Nijmegen, and in 1960, in Theology (STL) from the Jesuit Faculty in Leuven. He also holds a licentiate in Eastern History and Languages from the Catholic University of Leuven (1959). In 1965, he was awarded a doctorate in Sacred Scripture (DSS) at the Pontifical Biblical Institute in Rome.

Academic career 
Following his return from Rome in 1965, Jan Lambrecht first taught the New Testament at the Jesuit Faculty in Leuven. But in 1968, when the Flemish Faculty of Theology (Faculteit Godgeleerdheid) was created after the Catholic University of Leuven had split into the Dutch speaking Katholieke Universiteit Leuven and the French speaking Université Catholique de Louvain, he joined the newly formed Flemish Faculty. He remained there as Professor of New Testament and Biblical Greek until his retirement in 1990. Between 1985 and 1990, he served as the dean of the Faculty of Theology.

After his retirement from Leuven, he was a visiting professor at the Biblical Institute in Rome (1995-2000), at the major seminary of Pretoria (2001-2003), at the Loyola University in New Orleans (2007-2009), and at Le Moyne College in Syracuse (2009-2010).

He was also a member of the Pontifical Biblical Commission for two terms (1985–95), and was part of the group which prepared the commission's influential document on "The Interpretation of the Bible in the Church."

Selected works 
 
 
 
 
 
 
  - second edition in 2006 with added bibliography.

References

1926 births
Living people
New Testament scholars
20th-century Belgian Roman Catholic theologians
21st-century Belgian Roman Catholic theologians
Belgian expatriates in the Netherlands